It's About Time is the sixth studio album by American country music artist Tracy Byrd. It was his first album to be released on RCA Nashville after leaving MCA Nashville, his previous label, in 1999. The album produced the singles "Put Your Hand in Mine" (co-written by Jimmy Wayne), "Love, You Ain't Seen the Last of Me", and "Take Me with You When You Go". "Undo the Right" was originally recorded by Willie Nelson on his 1962 album And Then I Wrote.

Track listing

Personnel
As listed in liner notes.

 Eddie Bayers – drums, percussion
 Tracy Byrd – lead vocals
 Larry Byrom – electric guitar
 Pat Coil – synthesizer
 Larry Franklin – fiddle
 Paul Franklin – steel guitar
 Johnny Gimble – fiddle
 Aubrey Haynie – fiddle
 Wes Hightower – background vocals
 John Barlow Jarvis – piano
 Paul Leim – drums, washboard
 Bob Mason – cello
 Brent Mason – electric guitar
 Steve Nathan – synthesizer
 Matt Rollings – piano, B-3 organ, Wurlitzer
 John Wesley Ryles – background vocals
 Wayne Toups – accordion
 Billy Joe Walker, Jr. – electric guitar, acoustic guitar
 Biff Watson – acoustic guitar
 Dennis Wilson – background vocals
 Glenn Worf – bass guitar
 Curtis "Mr. Harmony" Young – background vocals
 Reggie Young – electric guitar

Chart performance

References

1999 albums
Tracy Byrd albums
RCA Records albums
Albums produced by Billy Joe Walker Jr.